8400 or variation, may refer to:

In general
 A.D. 8400, a year in the 9th millennium CE
 8400 BCE, a year in the 9th millennium BC
 8400, a number in the 8000 (number) range

Other uses
 8400 Tomizo, an asteroid in the Asteroid Belt, the 8400th asteroid registered
 Texas Instruments 8400 series ICs, a variant of the 7400-series integrated circuits
 Kintetsu 8400 series electric multiple unit train series

See also

 

 E8400 (disambiguation)